Helconidea is a genus of insects belonging to the family Braconidae.

The species of this genus are found in Europe and Northern America.

Species:
 Helconidea borealis (Cresson, 1873) 
 Helconidea dentator (Fabricius, 1804)

References

Braconidae
Braconidae genera